Salvia corrugata is a perennial shrub native to Colombia, Peru, and Ecuador, growing at 8000–9800 ft elevation. It was brought into horticulture about 2000 as a result of a collecting trip to South America in 1988. All the plants in cultivation today are from six seeds that germinated from that trip.

Salvia corrugata reaches 9 ft in its native habitat, and 5–6 ft in cultivation. It has egg-shaped deeply corrugated evergreen leaves that are 4.5 in by 1.5 in, dark green on the top surface, and light veining with pale tan-colored fine hairs underneath. The brilliant purple-blue flowers are 1 in long, with a small dark purple and green calyx. The flowers grow in congested whorls, with 6–12 flowers on each 3–4 in inflorescence.

Notes

corrugata
Flora of Colombia
Flora of Ecuador
Flora of Peru
Taxa named by Martin Vahl